The San José Jazz Summer Fest (originally known as the San Jose Jazz Festival) is an annual music festival organized by non-profit San Jose Jazz and held in downtown San Jose, California. The festival was established in 1990. The festival began charging fees in 2006. The main stage is in Plaza de César Chávez with others nearby.

The inaugural edition in 1990 was a one-day event with one stage.

References

External links 
Official site

1990 establishments in California
Culture of San Jose, California
Festivals in the San Francisco Bay Area
Jazz clubs in California
Jazz festivals in California
Music of the San Francisco Bay Area
Recurring events established in 1990
Tourist attractions in San Jose, California